Virginie Calmels (born 11 February 1971) is a French businesswoman and politician. She is the former chief executive officer (CEO) of Canal+ and Endemol. She was Alain Juppé’s deputy mayor in Bordeaux. She is also the regional councillor of Nouvelle-Aquitaine.

Education 
Calmels holds a diploma in accounting and auditing from the École supérieure de commerce (ESC) in Toulouse in 1993. She also studied the Advanced Management Program (AMP) at INSEAD.

Career 
Calmels started her career in 1993 as the financial auditor for Salustro Reydel. In 2000, she joined Canal+ as its finance director and was later promoted as its CEO. She left Canal+ in 2002.

In 2003, Calmels was at first appointed as general director of Endemol France and later became its president in 2007. In 2012, Virginie Calmels was promoted to the role of COO of Endemol world while remaining CEO of Endemol France’s unit. She left the Endemol Group in 2013.

In January 2013, Calmels replaced Mr. Antoine Jeancourt-Galignani as chairman of Euro Disney S.C.A.

In March 2016, she was appointed as a member of Assystem’s board of directors.

References 

1971 births
Living people
People from Talence
The Republicans (France) politicians
French business executives
21st-century French businesswomen
21st-century French businesspeople
Toulouse Business School alumni
INSEAD alumni
Knights of the Ordre national du Mérite
Politicians from Nouvelle-Aquitaine